In numerical methods, total variation diminishing (TVD) is a property of certain discretization schemes used to solve hyperbolic partial differential equations. The most notable application of this method is in computational fluid dynamics. The concept of TVD was introduced by Ami Harten.

Model equation
In systems described by partial differential equations, such as the following hyperbolic advection equation,

the total variation (TV) is given by

and the total variation for the discrete case is,

where .

A numerical method is said to be total variation diminishing (TVD) if,

Characteristics

A numerical scheme is said to be monotonicity preserving if the following properties are maintained:

 proved the following properties for a numerical scheme,

A monotone scheme is TVD, and
A TVD scheme is monotonicity preserving.

Application in CFD
In Computational Fluid Dynamics, TVD scheme is employed to capture sharper shock predictions without any misleading oscillations when variation of field variable “” is discontinuous.
To capture the variation fine grids ( very small) are needed and the computation becomes heavy and therefore uneconomic. The use of coarse grids with  central difference scheme, upwind scheme, hybrid difference scheme, and power law scheme gives false shock predictions. TVD scheme enables sharper shock predictions on coarse grids saving computation time and as the scheme preserves monotonicity there are no spurious oscillations in the solution.

Discretisation
Consider the steady state one-dimensional convection diffusion equation,

,

Making the flux balance of this property about a control volume we get,

  

Here  is the normal to the surface of control volume.

Ignoring the source term, the equation further reduces to:

 
Assuming

  and  

The equation reduces to

Say,

From the figure:

The equation becomes: The continuity equation also has to be satisfied in one of its equivalent forms for this problem:

Assuming diffusivity is a homogeneous property and equal grid spacing we can say

we getThe equation further reduces toThe equation above can be written aswhere  is the Péclet number

TVD scheme

So,

It therefore takes into account the values of property depending on the direction of flow and using the weighted functions tries to achieve monotonicity in the solution thereby producing results with no spurious shocks.

Limitations
Monotone schemes are attractive for solving engineering and scientific problems because they do not produce non-physical solutions. Godunov's theorem proves that linear schemes which preserve monotonicity are, at most, only first order accurate. Higher order linear schemes, although more accurate for smooth solutions, are not TVD and tend to introduce spurious oscillations (wiggles) where discontinuities or shocks arise. To overcome these drawbacks, various high-resolution, non-linear techniques have been developed, often using flux/slope limiters.

See also
 Flux limiters
 Godunov's theorem
 High-resolution scheme
 MUSCL scheme
 Sergei K. Godunov
 Total variation

References

Further reading

Hirsch, C. (1990), Numerical Computation of Internal and External Flows, Vol 2, Wiley.
Laney, C. B. (1998), Computational Gas Dynamics, Cambridge University Press.
Toro, E. F. (1999), Riemann Solvers and Numerical Methods for Fluid Dynamics, Springer-Verlag.
Tannehill, J. C., Anderson, D. A., and Pletcher, R. H. (1997), Computational Fluid Mechanics and Heat Transfer, 2nd Ed., Taylor & Francis.
Wesseling, P. (2001), Principles of Computational Fluid Dynamics, Springer-Verlag.
Anil W. Date Introduction to Computational Fluid Dynamics, Cambridge University Press.

Numerical differential equations
Computational fluid dynamics